Komer is a surname. Notable people with the surname include:

Jaime Komer (born 1981), American water polo player
Robert Komer (1922–2000), American diplomat

See also
Homer (name)

Jewish surnames